Hadsten station is a railway station serving the railway town of Hadsten in East Jutland, Denmark.

The station is located on the Aarhus-Randers Line from Aarhus to Randers. It offers direct InterCity services to Copenhagen, Aalborg, Frederikshavn and Struer as well as regional train services to Aarhus, Aalborg and Struer. The train services are operated by the railway companies DSB and Arriva.

History 
Hadsten station was opened in 1862 with the opening of the Aarhus-Randers railway line from Aarhus to Randers.

Operations 

The train services are operated by DSB and Arriva. The station offers direct InterCity services to Copenhagen, Frederikshavn and Struer as well as regional train services to Aarhus, Aalborg and Struer.

See also
 List of railway stations in Denmark

References

Citations

Bibliography

External links

 Banedanmark – government agency responsible for maintenance and traffic control of most of the Danish railway network
 DSB – largest Danish train operating company
 Arriva – British multinational public transport company operating bus and train services in Denmark
 Danske Jernbaner – website with information on railway history in Denmark

Railway stations opened in 1862
Railway stations in the Central Denmark Region
1862 establishments in Denmark
Railway stations in Denmark opened in the 19th century